El Prat is the name of the following places:

The town El Prat de Llobregat
Josep Tarradellas Barcelona–El Prat Airport, located near the town